Zola Matumona (born 26 November 1981) is a Congolese former professional footballer who played as a left winger.

Club career

Early career
Matumona arrived at the AS Vita Club of Kinshasa, one of the biggest clubs in the DR Congo, after spending a season at Styles of Congo, a second division club. He quickly became the darling of the fans club green and black that call him "Room" in reference to his game comparable to the German player, Karl-Heinz Rummenigge. He spent five seasons, won a championship of the Congo, several league titles Kinshasa, he participated in the CAF Champions League and the CAF Cup with his club. He also wins the award for best player of Congo several times before leaving the club.

Brussels
Matumona landed at FC Brussels in 2007 for a sum of €60,000.

Matumona walked out of FC Brussels on 2 November 2007 after he accused club chairman Johan Vermeersch of making racist remarks towards him during a crisis meeting at the struggling club. Vermeersch was reported to have told Matumona to "think about other things than trees and bananas". The incident also prompted the club's main sponsor, Korean car manufacturer Kia, to withdraw their sponsorship of the Belgian side. But he terminated his contract unilaterally with the club following the racist remarks against him by the President. According to the player's lawyer, Johan Vermeersch had rebuked Matumona and had explained that he "was not in his country and had to forget trees and bananas" in the presence of staff and other players. The lawyer confirms his statements but said it was "a joke". Although on 7 November Matumona agreed to return to FC Brussels after talks with Vermeesch, Kia still refused to renew their contract with the club.

He eventually resumed his contract binding him to the club until 2009 after a meeting with the president who publicly apologized for his remarks.

Matumona later attracted interest from England. After visa problems initially delayed his trial with Birmingham City, he trained with the club during the 2007–08 season and joined their July 2008 pre-season tour, where he impressed manager Alex McLeish in a 3–1 victory over Czech side FC Viktoria Plzeň.

Mons
Matumona subsequently committed to Mons, a second division club where the coach Rudi Cossey decided to incorporate it within its nucleus for the 2009–10 season.

International career
Matumona made his international debut on 20 August 2002 vs Algeria in a 1–1 draw. He scored his first international goal on 5 June 2005 vs Kampala when Democratic Republic of Congo. won 4–0.

References

External links
 

1981 births
Living people
Footballers from Kinshasa
Democratic Republic of the Congo footballers
Democratic Republic of the Congo international footballers
Association football wingers
Democratic Republic of the Congo expatriates in Angola
AS Vita Club players
R.W.D.M. Brussels F.C. players
C.D. Primeiro de Agosto players
Gaziantepspor footballers
R.A.E.C. Mons players
Expatriate footballers in Angola
Expatriate footballers in Belgium
Belgian Pro League players
Challenger Pro League players
2006 Africa Cup of Nations players
2013 Africa Cup of Nations players